Sirius XM Love is a music channel that plays love songs from soft-AC artists and airs on Sirius XM Radio, and Dish Network. It airs on channel 708 on Sirius XM Radio.  On XM, it replaced former channel The Heart on November 12, 2008.  On Sirius XM Canada, the channel retained the old Sirius Love name, Until February 9, 2010, Sirius XM Love was on DirecTV channel 819, but all of the Sirius XM programming was dropped in favor of Sonic Tap.

From 2009–2014, Sirius XM Love was pre-empted annually during the Christmas season and replaced with "Holly," a seasonal format devoted to contemporary pop Christmas music. This format change typically occurred during the first two weeks of November and continued until the end of the year. (Holly is also available year-round through Sirius XM's online service.) From 2015–2016, Holly pre-empted Sirius XM's Velvet instead.  On May 22, 2015, Sirius XM Love became a limited-run James Taylor Channel. Later, it was the home of Yacht Rock Radio. On August 17, 2017, SiriusXM Love moved to channel 70 and was replaced by PopRocks on Channel 17. For 2018, Love was pre-empted by a different Christmas music channel known as Hallmark Channel Radio—which was hosted by the channel's talent as an extension of its seasonal programming lineup "Countdown to Christmas"..  In 2020 and 2021, Love was once again pre-empted for the limited-run Billy Joel channel and Yacht Rock Radio, and in October 2021 it was announced that Love would move to online-only on channel 708.  It was replaced by Siriusly Sinatra on channel 70.

Selected artists played 
Gloria Estefan, Luther Vandross, Bryan Adams, Mariah Carey, Kenny G, Barry Manilow, Kelly Clarkson, Bette Midler, 
Lionel Richie, Pink

References

See also
 List of Sirius XM Radio channels

Sirius Satellite Radio channels
XM Satellite Radio channels
Soft adult contemporary radio stations in the United States
Sirius XM Radio channels
Radio stations established in 2008